The 1990 European Cup final was a football match between Milan of Italy and Benfica of Portugal, played on 23 May 1990 at the Praterstadion in Vienna, Austria. The winning goal came in the 68th minute for Milan, when Frank Rijkaard ran through the opposing defence and scored the only goal of the match.

Before 2017, Milan were the last side to have defended the trophy after winning it the previous season.

Route to the final

Match

Details

See also
1963 European Cup final – contested between same teams
1989–90 European Cup
A.C. Milan in European football
S.L. Benfica in international football

References

External links
1989–90 season at UEFA.com

1
European Cup Final 1990
European Cup Final 1990
European Cup Final 1990
UEFA Champions League finals
Euro
Euro
May 1990 sports events in Europe
Sports competitions in Vienna
1990s in Vienna